Euproutia is a genus of moths in the family Geometridae described by David Stephen Fletcher in 1979.

Species
Euproutia aggravaria Guenée, [1858]
Euproutia aggravaria intermaculata Warren, 1905
Euproutia rufomarginata Pagenstecher, 1893
Euproutia vernicoma Prout, 1913

References

Geometrinae
Geometridae genera